Andrea Bruniera (born 10 February 1964) is a retired Italian football midfielder.

References

1964 births
Living people
Italian footballers
Calcio Montebelluna players
Atalanta B.C. players
Civitanovese Calcio players
A.C. Ancona players
Udinese Calcio players
Alma Juventus Fano 1906 players
S.P.A.L. players
Trapani Calcio players
Fermana F.C. players
Association football midfielders
Serie A players